Lukavec u Hořic is a municipality and village in Jičín District in the Hradec Králové Region of the Czech Republic. It has about 300 inhabitants.

Administrative parts
Villages of Černín and Dobeš are administrative parts of Lukavec u Hořic.

References

Villages in Jičín District